The Turkish Men's Volleyball Super Cup is the super cup competition for men's volleyball clubs in Turkey, organized by the Turkish Volleyball Federation since 2009. It is contested between the winners of the Turkish Volleyball League and the Turkish Cup.

Most successful team of the competition are Fenerbahçe and Halkbank with four titles.

Finals

Source:

Performance by club

See also
 Men's
Turkish Men's Volleyball League
Turkish Men's Volleyball Cup
Turkish Men's Volleyball Super Cup
 Wome's
Turkish Women's Volleyball League
Turkish Women's Volleyball Cup
Turkish Women's Volleyball Super Cup

References

External links

Volleyball competitions in Turkey
Men's volleyball in Turkey
Recurring sporting events established in 2009
2009 establishments in Turkey